NSA is the National Security Agency, a United States governmental agency.

NSA may also refer to:

Organizations
 National Safety Associates, a Tennessee-based multilevel marketing company
 National Scrabble Association, a group of Scrabble players
 National Security Archive, a nongovernmental research institution at George Washington University
 National Sheep Association, a trade association in the UK for sheep farming
 National Sheriffs' Association, an organization of law enforcement specialists in the U.S.
 National Socialism Association, a Taiwanese neo-Nazi organisation
 National Softball Association, a U.S. support organization for players of the game
 National Speakers Association, a professional speakers' organization
 National Spiritual Assembly, an administrative body of the Bahá'í Faith
 National Sports Academy "Vasil Levski", Bulgaria
 National Sports Academy (Lake Placid, New York), a former preparatory school for winter-sport athletes 
 National Student Association, an American student organization from the 1940s-'70s
 National Stuttering Association, U.S.
 New Saint Andrews College, in Idaho, U.S.
 New Syrian Army, a group of Syrian Arab Army defectors established during the Syrian Civil War
 Nichiren Shoshu America, an earlier name for the American division of present-day Soka Gakkai International
 Norwegian Shipowners' Association, the Norwegian shipowners organization in Norway
 North Sunflower Academy, a school in Sunflower County, Mississippi, U.S.

Government
 Supreme Administrative Court of Poland (Naczelny Sąd Administracyjny), the Polish court of last resort for administrative law disputes
 National Security Agency (Bahrain), a Bahrain governmental agency
 National Security Agency (Montenegro), a Montenegrin governmental agency
 National Security Authority, a Norwegian intelligence agency
 NATO Maintenance and Supply Agency, a NATO agency located in Capellen, Luxembourg
 NATO Standardization Agency, a NATO agency located in Brussels, Belgium

Government position
 National Security Advisor (Canada)
 National Security Advisor (India)
 National Security Advisor (United States)
 National Security Adviser (United Kingdom)

Other uses
 National scenic area (Scotland), a conservation designation in Scotland
 National Supers Agency, a fictional organization of superheroes from the film The Incredibles
 National Sound Archive, a sound archive hosted by the British Library
 National Security Area, a designated airspace through which flight is discouraged in the US
 Neue Schubert-Ausgabe, 20th-21st century edition of Franz Schubert's compositions
 New Series Adventures (Doctor Who), a series of novels based on the television programme Doctor Who
 New Statistical Account of Scotland, United Kingdom
 Next Step Agencies, bodies which perform public functions of government but modeled on the private sector 
 Non-standard analysis (since 1966), a variant of calculus using infinitesimals
 No sulphite added, wines without added sulphites
 Non-state actor, a non-state entity which participates in international relations
 Not seasonally adjusted, for a statistical time series; See Seasonal adjustment

See also
 National Security Act (disambiguation)
 NASA (disambiguation)
 No Strings Attached (disambiguation)